Tore Meinecke and Ricki Osterthun were the defending champions, but Osterthun did not participate this year.  Meinecke partnered Tomás Carbonell, losing in the first round.

Rikard Bergh and Per Henricsson won in the final 6–4, 7–5, against Pablo Arraya and Karel Nováček.

Seeds

Draw

Draw

References
Draw

ATP Athens Open
1988 Grand Prix (tennis)